Reflexive may refer to:

In fiction:
Metafiction

In grammar:
Reflexive pronoun, a pronoun with a reflexive relationship with its self-identical antecedent
Reflexive verb, where a semantic agent and patient are the same

In mathematics and computer science:
Reflexive relation, a relation where elements of a set are self-related
Reflexive user interface, an interface that permits its own command verbs and sometimes underlying code to be edited
Reflexive operator algebra, an operator algebra that has enough invariant subspaces to characterize it
Reflexive space, a subset of Banach spaces
Reflexive bilinear form, a bilinear form for which the order of a pair of vectors does not affect whether it evaluates to zero.

In biology
Reflexive antagonism, the phenomenon by which muscles with opposing functions tend to antagonistically inhibit each other.

Other uses:
 Reflexive Entertainment, a video game developer
Reflexivity (social theory), a concept in social theory relating to the capacity of an individual agent to act against influences of socialization and social structure

See also
Reflection (disambiguation)
Reflections (disambiguation)